Bupropion, sold under the brand name Wellbutrin among others, is an atypical antidepressant primarily used to treat major depressive disorder and to support smoking cessation. It is also popular as an add-on medication in the cases of "incomplete response" to the first-line selective serotonin reuptake inhibitor (SSRI) antidepressant. Bupropion has several features that distinguish it from other antidepressants: it does not usually cause sexual dysfunction; it is not associated with weight gain and sleepiness, and it is more effective than SSRIs at improving symptoms of hypersomnia and fatigue. Bupropion, particularly the immediate release formulation, carries a higher risk of seizure than many other antidepressants and caution is recommended in patients with a history of seizure disorder.

Common adverse effects of bupropion with the greatest difference from placebo are dry mouth, nausea, constipation, insomnia, anxiety, tremor, and excessive sweating. Raised blood pressure is notable. Rare but serious side effects include seizure, liver toxicity, psychosis, and risk of overdose. Bupropion use during pregnancy may be associated with increased odds of congenital heart defects.

Bupropion acts as a norepinephrine–dopamine reuptake inhibitor and a nicotinic receptor antagonist. However, its effects on dopamine are weak. Chemically, bupropion is an aminoketone that belongs to the class of substituted cathinones and more generally that of substituted amphetamines and substituted phenethylamines.

Bupropion was invented by Nariman Mehta, who worked at Burroughs Wellcome, in 1969. It was first approved for medical use in the United States in 1985. Bupropion was originally called by the generic name amfebutamone, before being renamed in 2000. In 2020, it was the eighteenth most commonly prescribed medication in the United States, with more than 28million prescriptions. It is on the World Health Organization's List of Essential Medicines.

Medical uses

Depression
The evidence overall supports the efficacy of bupropion over placebo for the treatment of depression. However, the quality of evidence is low. Most meta-analyses report that bupropion has an at-most small effect size for depression. Only one meta-analysis reported a large effect size. However, there were methodological limitations with this meta-analysis, including using a subset of only five trials for the effect size calculation, substantial variability in effect sizes between the selected trials—which led the authors to state that their findings in this area should be interpreted with "extreme caution"—and general lack of inclusion of unpublished trials in the meta-analysis. Unpublished trials are more likely to be negative in findings, and other meta-analyses have included unpublished trials. Evidence suggests that the efficacy of bupropion for depression is similar to that of other antidepressants.

Over the fall and winter months, bupropion prevents development of depression in those who have recurring seasonal affective disorder: 15% of participants on bupropion experienced a major depressive episode vs. 27% of those on placebo. Bupropion also improves depression in bipolar disorder, with the efficacy and risk of affective switch being similar to other antidepressants.

Bupropion has several features that distinguish it from other antidepressants: for instance, unlike the majority of antidepressants, it does not usually cause sexual dysfunction, and the occurrence of sexual side effects is not different from placebo. Bupropion treatment is not associated with weight gain; on the contrary, the majority of studies observed significant weight loss in bupropion-treated participants. Bupropion treatment also is not associated with the sleepiness that may be produced by other antidepressants. Bupropion is more effective than selective serotonin reuptake inhibitors (SSRIs) at improving symptoms of hypersomnia and fatigue in depressed patients. There appears to be a modest advantage for the SSRIs compared to bupropion in the treatment of depression with high anxiety; they are equivalent for depression with moderate or low anxiety.

The addition of bupropion to a prescribed SSRI is a common strategy when people do not respond to the SSRI, and it is supported by clinical trials; however, it appears to be inferior to the addition of atypical antipsychotic aripiprazole.

Smoking cessation
Prescribed as an aid for smoking cessation bupropion reduces the severity of craving for nicotine and withdrawal symptoms such as depressed
mood, irritability, difficulty concentrating, and increased appetite. Initially, bupropion slows the weight gain that often occurs in the first weeks after quitting smoking. With time, however, this effect becomes negligible.

The bupropion treatment course lasts for seven to twelve weeks, with the patient halting the use of tobacco about ten days into the course. After the course, the effectiveness of bupropion for maintaining abstinence from smoking declines over time, from 37% of tobacco abstinence at 3 months to 20% at one year. It is unclear whether extending bupropion treatment helps to prevent relapse of smoking.

Overall, six months after the therapy, bupropion increases the likelihood of quitting smoking by approximately 1.6 fold as compared to placebo. In this respect, bupropion is as effective as nicotine replacement therapy but inferior to varenicline. Combining bupropion and nicotine replacement therapy does not improve the quitting rate.

In children and adolescents, the use of bupropion for smoking cessation does not appear to offer any significant benefits. The evidence for its use to aid smoking cessation in pregnant women is insufficient.

Attention deficit hyperactivity disorder
The treatment of attention deficit hyperactivity disorder (ADHD) is not an approved indication of bupropion, and it is not mentioned in the current (2019) guideline on the ADHD treatment from the American Academy of Pediatrics. Systematic reviews of bupropion for the treatment of ADHD in both adults and children note that bupropion may be effective for ADHD but warn that this conclusion has to be interpreted with caution, because clinical trials were of low quality due to small sizes and risk of bias. Similarly to atomoxetine, bupropion has a delayed onset of action for ADHD, and several weeks of treatment are required for therapeutic effects. This is in contrast to stimulants, such as amphetamine and methylphenidate, which have an immediate onset of effect in the condition.

Sexual dysfunction
Bupropion is less likely than other antidepressants to cause sexual dysfunction. A range of studies indicate that bupropion not only produces fewer sexual side effects than other antidepressants but can actually help to alleviate sexual dysfunction including sexual dysfunction induced by SSRI antidepressants. There have also been small studies suggesting that bupropion or a bupropion/trazodone combination may improve some measures of sexual function in women who have hypoactive sexual desire disorder (HSDD) and are not depressed. According to an expert consensus recommendation from the International Society for the Study of Women's Sexual Health, bupropion can be considered as an off-label treatment for HSDD despite limited safety and efficacy data. Likewise, a 2022 systematic review and meta-analysis of bupropion for sexual desire disorder in women reported that although data were limited, bupropion appeared to be dose-dependently effective for the condition.

Obesity
Bupropion, when used for treating obesity over a period of 6 to 12 months, results in an average weight loss of 2.7 kg (5.9 lbs) over placebo. This is not much different from the weight loss produced by several other weight-loss medications such as sibutramine or orlistat. The combination drug naltrexone/bupropion has been approved by the U.S. Food and Drug Administration (FDA) for the treatment of obesity.

Other uses
Bupropion is not effective in the treatment of cocaine dependence, but it is showing promise in reducing drug use in light methamphetamine users. Based on studies indicating that bupropion lowers the level of the inflammatory mediator TNF-alpha, there have been suggestions that it might be useful in treating inflammatory bowel disease, psoriasis, and other autoimmune conditions, but very little clinical evidence is available. Bupropion is not effective in treating chronic low back pain.

Available forms

Bupropion is available as an oral tablet in a number of different formulations. It is formulated mostly as the hydrochloride salt but also to a lesser extent as the hydrobromide salt. The available forms of bupropion hydrochloride include IR (instant-release) tablets (50, 75, 100mg), SR (sustained-release) tablets (50, 100, 150, 200mg), and XL (extended-release) tablets (150, 300, 450mg). The only marketed form of bupropion hydrobromide is Aplenzin, an extended-release oral tablet (174, 348, 522mg). In addition to single-drug formulations, bupropion is formulated in combinations including naltrexone/bupropion (Contrave; 8mg/90mg extended-release tablets) and dextromethorphan/bupropion (Auvelity; 45mg/105mg tablets).

Contraindications
The drug label advises that bupropion should not be prescribed to individuals with epilepsy or other conditions that lower the seizure threshold, such as anorexia nervosa, bulimia nervosa, benzodiazepine or alcohol withdrawal. It should be avoided in individuals who are taking monoamine oxidase inhibitors (MAOIs). The label recommends that caution should be exercised when treating people with liver damage, severe kidney disease, and severe hypertension, and in children, adolescents and young adults due to the increased risk of suicidal ideation.

Side effects

The common adverse effects of bupropion with the greatest difference from placebo are dry mouth, nausea, constipation, insomnia, anxiety, tremor, and excessive sweating. Bupropion has the highest incidence of insomnia of all second-generation antidepressants, apart from desvenlafaxine. It is also associated with about 20% increased risk of headache.

Bupropion raises blood pressure in some people. One study showed an average rise of 6 mm Hg in systolic blood pressure in 10% of patients. The prescribing information notes that hypertension, sometimes severe, is observed in some people taking bupropion, both with and without pre-existing hypertension. Safety of bupropion in people with cardiovascular conditions and its general cardiovascular safety profile remain unclear due to the lack of data.

Seizure is a rare but serious adverse effect of bupropion. It is strongly dose-dependent: for the immediate release preparation, the seizure incidence is 0.4% at the dose 300–450 mg per day; the incidence climbs almost ten-fold for the higher than recommended dose of 600 mg. For comparison, the incidence of unprovoked seizure in the general population is 0.07 to 0.09%, and the risk of seizure for a variety of other antidepressants is generally between 0 and 0.5% at the recommended doses.

Cases of liver toxicity leading to death or liver transplantation have been reported for bupropion. It is considered to be one of several antidepressants with greater risk of hepatotoxicity.

The prescribing information warns about bupropion triggering an angle-closure glaucoma attack. On the other hand, bupropion may decrease the risk of development of open angle glaucoma.

Bupropion use by mothers in the first trimester of pregnancy is associated with 23% increase of the odds in congenital heart defects in their children.

Bupropion has rarely been associated with instances of Stevens–Johnson syndrome.

Psychiatric
The FDA requires all antidepressants, including bupropion, to carry a boxed warning stating that antidepressants may increase the risk of suicide in people younger than 25. This warning is based on a statistical analysis conducted by the FDA which found a 2-fold increase in suicidal thought and behavior in children and adolescents, and 1.5-fold increase in the 18–24 age group. For this analysis the FDA combined the results of 295 trials of 11 antidepressants in order to obtain statistically significant results. Considered in isolation, bupropion was not statistically different from placebo.

Bupropion prescribed for smoking cessation results in 25% increase of the risk of psychiatric side effects, in particular, anxiety (about 40% increase) and insomnia (about 80% increase). The evidence is insufficient to determine whether bupropion is associated with suicides or suicidal behavior.

In rare cases, bupropion-induced psychosis may develop. It is associated with higher doses of bupropion; many cases described are at higher than recommended doses. Concurrent antipsychotic medication appears to be protective. In most cases the psychotic symptoms are eliminated by reducing the dose, ceasing treatment or adding antipsychotic medication.

Although studies are lacking, a handful of case reports suggest that abrupt discontinuation of bupropion may cause antidepressant discontinuation syndrome.

Overdose
Bupropion is considered moderately dangerous in overdose. According to an analysis of US National Poison Data System, adjusted for the number of prescriptions, bupropion and venlafaxine are the two new generation antidepressants (that is excluding tricyclic antidepressants) that result in the highest mortality and morbidity. For significant overdoses, seizures have been reported in about a third of all cases; other serious effects include hallucinations, loss of consciousness, and abnormal heart rhythms. When bupropion was one of several kinds of pills taken in an overdose, fever, muscle rigidity, muscle damage, hypertension or hypotension, stupor, coma, and respiratory failure have been reported. While most people recover, some people have died, having had multiple uncontrolled seizures and myocardial infarction.

Interactions
Since bupropion is metabolized to hydroxybupropion by the enzyme CYP2B6, drug interactions with CYP2B6 inhibitors are possible: this includes such medications as paroxetine, sertraline, norfluoxetine (active metabolite of fluoxetine), diazepam, clopidogrel, and orphenadrine. The expected result is the increase of bupropion and decrease of hydroxybupropion blood concentration. The reverse effect (decrease of bupropion and increase of hydroxybupropion) can be expected with CYP2B6 inducers such as carbamazepine, clotrimazole, rifampicin, ritonavir, St John's wort, and phenobarbital. Indeed, carbamazepine decreases exposure to bupropion by 90% and increases exposure to hydroxybupropion by 94%. Ritonavir, lopinavir/ritonavir, and efavirenz have been shown to decrease levels of bupropion and/or its metabolites. Ticlopidine and clopidogrel, both potent CYP2B6 inhibitors, have been found to considerably increase bupropion levels as well as decrease levels of its metabolite hydroxybupropion.

Bupropion and its metabolites are inhibitors of CYP2D6, with hydroxybupropion responsible for most of the inhibition. Additionally, bupropion and its metabolites may decrease expression of CYP2D6 in the liver. The end effect is a significant slowing of the clearance of other drugs metabolized by this enzyme. For instance, bupropion has been found to increase area-under-the-curve of desipramine, a CYP2D6 substrate, by 5-fold. Bupropion has also been found to increase levels of atomoxetine by 5.1-fold, while decreasing the exposure to its main metabolite by 1.5-fold. As another example, the ratio of dextromethorphan (a drug that is mainly metabolized by CYP2D6) to its major metabolite dextrorphan increased approximately 35-fold when it was administered to people being treated with 300 mg/day bupropion. When people on bupropion are given MDMA, about 30% increase of exposure to both drugs is observed, with enhanced mood but decreased heart rate effects of MDMA. Interactions with other CYP2D6 substrates, such as metoprolol, imipramine, nortriptyline, venlafaxine, and nebivolol have also been reported. However, in a notable exception, bupropion does not seem to affect the concentrations of CYP2D6 substrates fluoxetine and paroxetine.

Bupropion lowers the seizure threshold, and therefore can potentially interact with other medications that also lower it, such as antipsychotics, tricyclic antidepressants, theophylline, and systemic corticosteroids. The prescribing information recommends minimizing the use of alcohol, since in rare cases bupropion reduces alcohol tolerance.

Caution should be observed when combining bupropion with a monoamine oxidase inhibitor (MAOI), as it may result in hypertensive crisis.

Pharmacology

Pharmacodynamics
The mechanism of action of bupropion in the treatment of depression and for other indications is unclear. However, it is thought to be related to the fact that bupropion is a norepinephrine–dopamine reuptake inhibitor (NDRI) and antagonist of several nicotinic acetylcholine receptors. It is uncertain whether bupropion is a norepinephrine–dopamine releasing agent. Pharmacological actions of bupropion, to a substantial degree, are due to its active metabolites hydroxybupropion, threo-hydrobupropion, and erythro-hydrobupropion that are present in the blood plasma at comparable or much higher levels. In fact, bupropion could accurately be conceptualized as a prodrug of these metabolites. Overall action of these metabolites, and particularly one enantiomer S,S-hydroxybupropion, is also characterized by inhibition of norepinephrine and dopamine reuptake and nicotinic antagonism (see the chart on the right). Bupropion has no meaningful direct activity at a variety of receptors, including α- and β-adrenergic, dopamine, serotonin, histamine, and muscarinic acetylcholine receptors.

The occupancy of dopamine transporter (DAT) by bupropion (300mg/day) and its metabolites in the human brain as measured by several positron emission tomography (PET) studies is approximately 20%, with a mean occupancy range of about 14 to 26%. For comparison, the NDRI methylphenidate at therapeutic doses is thought to occupy greater than 50% of DAT sites. In accordance with its low DAT occupancy, no measurable dopamine release in the human brain was detected with bupropion (one 150mg dose) in a PET study. These findings raise questions about the role of dopamine reuptake inhibition in the pharmacology of bupropion, and suggest that other actions may be responsible for its therapeutic effects. More research is needed in this area. No data are available on occupancy of the norepinephrine transporter (NET) by bupropion and its metabolites. However, due to the increased exposure of hydroxybupropion over bupropion itself, which has higher affinity for the NET than the DAT, bupropion's overall pharmacological profile in humans may end up making it effectively more of a norepinephrine reuptake inhibitor than a dopamine reuptake inhibitor. Accordingly, the clinical effects of bupropion are more consistent with noradrenergic activity than with dopaminergic actions.

Pharmacokinetics

After oral administration, bupropion is rapidly and completely absorbed reaching the peak blood plasma concentration after 1.5 hours (tmax). Sustained release (SR) and extended release (XL) formulations have been designed to slow down absorption resulting in tmax of 3 hours and 5 hours, respectively. Absolute bioavailability of bupropion is unknown but is presumed to be low, at 5–20%, due to the first-pass metabolism. As for the relative bioavailability of the formulations, XL formulation has lower bioavailability (68%) compared to SR formulation and immediate release bupropion.

Bupropion is metabolized in the body by a variety of pathways. The oxidative pathways are by cytochrome P450 isoenzymes CYP2B6 leading to R,R- and S,S-hydroxybupropion and, to a lesser degree, CYP2C19 leading to 4'-hydroxybupropion. The reductive pathways are by 11β-hydroxysteroid dehydrogenase type 1 in the liver and AKR7A2/AKR7A3 in the intestine leading to threo-hydrobupropion and by yet unknown enzyme leading to erythro-hydrobupropion.

The metabolism of bupropion is highly variable: the effective doses of bupropion received by persons who ingest the same amount of the drug may differ by as much as 5.5 times (with a half-life of 12–30 hours), while the effective doses of hydroxybupropion may differ by as much as 7.5 times (with a half-life of 15–25 hours). Based on this, some researchers have advocated monitoring of the blood level of bupropion and hydroxybupropion.

Chemistry
Bupropion is an aminoketone that belongs to the class of substituted cathinones and the more general class of substituted phenethylamines. The clinically used bupropion is racemic, that is a mixture of two enantiomers: S-bupropion and R-bupropion. Although the optical isomers on bupropion can be separated, they rapidly racemize under physiological conditions.

There have been reported cases of false-positive urine amphetamine tests in persons taking bupropion.

Synthesis
It is synthesized in two chemical steps starting from 3'-chloro-propiophenone. The alpha position adjacent to the ketone is first brominated followed by nucleophilic displacement of the resulting alpha-bromoketone with t-butylamine and treated with hydrochloric acid to give bupropion as the hydrochloride salt in 75–85% overall yield.

History

Bupropion was invented by Nariman Mehta of Burroughs Wellcome (now GlaxoSmithKline) in 1969, and the US patent for it was granted in 1974. It was approved by the U.S. Food and Drug Administration (FDA) as an antidepressant on 30 December 1985, and marketed under the name Wellbutrin. However, a significant incidence of seizures at the originally recommended dosage (400–600 mg/day) caused the withdrawal of the drug in 1986. Subsequently, the risk of seizures was found to be highly dose-dependent, and bupropion was re-introduced to the market in 1989 with a lower maximum recommended daily dose of 450 mg/day.

In 1996, the FDA approved a sustained-release formulation of alcohol-resistant bupropion called Wellbutrin SR, intended to be taken twice a day (as compared with three times a day for immediate-release Wellbutrin). In 2003, the FDA approved another sustained-release formulation called Wellbutrin XL, intended for once-daily dosing. Wellbutrin SR and XL are available in generic form in the United States and Canada. In 1997, bupropion was approved by the FDA for use as a smoking cessation aid under the name Zyban. In 2006, Wellbutrin XL was similarly approved as a treatment for seasonal affective disorder.

In France, marketing authorization was granted for Zyban in August 2001, with a maximum daily dose of 300 mg; only sustained-release bupropion is available, and only as a smoking cessation aid.

In October 2007, two providers of consumer information on nutritional products and supplements, ConsumerLab.com and The People's Pharmacy, released the results of comparative tests of different brands of bupropion. The People's Pharmacy received multiple reports of increased side effects and decreased efficacy of generic bupropion, which prompted it to ask ConsumerLab.com to test the products in question. The tests showed that "one of a few generic versions of Wellbutrin XL 300 mg, sold as Budeprion XL 300 mg, didn't perform the same as the brand-name pill in the lab." The FDA investigated these complaints and concluded that Budeprion XL is equivalent to Wellbutrin XL in regard to bioavailability of bupropion and its main active metabolite hydroxybupropion. The FDA also said that coincidental natural mood variation is the most likely explanation for the apparent worsening of depression after the switch from Wellbutrin XL to Budeprion XL. On 3 October 2012, however, the FDA reversed this opinion, announcing that "Budeprion XL 300 mg fails to demonstrate therapeutic equivalence to Wellbutrin XL 300 mg." The FDA did not test the bioequivalence of any of the other generic versions of Wellbutrin XL 300 mg, but requested that the four manufacturers submit data on this question to the FDA by March 2013.  the FDA has made determinations on the formulations from some manufacturers not being bioequivalent.

In April 2008, the FDA approved a formulation of bupropion as a hydrobromide salt instead of a hydrochloride salt, to be sold under the name Aplenzin by Sanofi-Aventis.

In 2009, the FDA issued a health advisory warning that the prescription of bupropion for smoking cessation has been associated with reports about unusual behavior changes, agitation and hostility. Some people, according to the advisory, have become depressed or have had their depression worsen, have had thoughts about suicide or dying, or have attempted suicide. This advisory was based on a review of anti-smoking products that identified 75 reports of "suicidal adverse events" for bupropion over ten years. Based on the results of follow-up trials this warning was removed in 2016.

In 2012, the U.S. Justice Department announced that GlaxoSmithKline had agreed to plead guilty and pay a $3 billion fine, in part for promoting the unapproved use of Wellbutrin for weight loss and sexual dysfunction.

In 2017, the European Medicines Agency recommended suspending a number of nationally approved medicines due to misrepresentation of bioequivalence study data by Micro Therapeutic Research Labs in India. The products recommended for suspension included several 300 mg modified-release bupropion tablets.

Society and culture

Recreational use
While bupropion demonstrates some potential for misuse, this potential is less than of other commonly used stimulants, being limited by features of its pharmacology. Case reports describe misuse of bupropion as producing a "high" similar to cocaine or amphetamine usage but with less intensity. Bupropion misuse is uncommon. There have been a number of anecdotal and case-study reports of bupropion abuse, but the bulk of evidence indicates that the subjective effects of bupropion when taken orally are markedly different from those of addictive stimulants such as cocaine or amphetamine. However, bupropion, by non-conventional routes of administration like injection or insufflation has been reported to be misused in the United States and Canada, notably in prisons.

Legal status
In Russia bupropion is banned as a narcotic drug, yet not per se but rather as a derivative of methcathinone.
In Australia and the UK, smoking cessation is the only licensed use of bupropion.

Brand names

Brand names include Wellbutrin, Aplenzin, Budeprion, Buproban, Forfivo, Zyban, Bupron, Bupisure, Bupep, Smoquite, Elontril, Buxon.

References

External links 

 
 
 

5-HT3 antagonists
Anorectics
Antidepressants
Antiobesity drugs
Aphrodisiacs
Attention deficit hyperactivity disorder management
Cathinones
Chlorobenzenes
CYP2D6 inhibitors
Dermatoxins
Ergogenic aids
Female sexual dysfunction drugs
GSK plc brands
Nicotinic antagonists
Norepinephrine–dopamine reuptake inhibitors
Phenethylamines
Prodrugs
Smoking cessation
Stimulants
Substituted amphetamines
Tert-butyl compounds
Wikipedia medicine articles ready to translate
World Health Organization essential medicines